Norwalk/Santa Fe Springs is a Metrolink rail station in the city of Norwalk, California.  It is served by Metrolink's 91 Line from Los Angeles Union Station to Riverside and  Metrolink's Orange County Line running from Los Angeles Union Station to Oceanside.  On weekdays, this station is served by 19 Orange County Line trains and nine 91 Line trains.  On weekends, eight Orange County Line trains and four 91 Line trains serve this station.

Platforms and tracks

Transit connections
Norwalk Transit operates a connector shuttle bus service Route 4 which covers the  gap between the Norwalk/Santa Fe Springs Transportation Center and the Metro C Line station in Norwalk.

Future plans
There have been persistent proposals for a  eastward extension of the Los Angeles Metro C Line (and later, through the currently under construction wye at Aviation/LAX, the K Line) from its current terminus at Norwalk Station to reach the Metrolink Station at Norwalk. This project carries a proposed cost of $321 million for an aerial bridge, and a $360 million cost for an underground tunnel. Since an initial Environmental Impact Review (EIR) in 1993, there has been no solid progress for this proposal. The Los Angeles County Metropolitan Transportation Authority (Metro) 2009 Long Range Transportation Plan (LRTP) lists funding priorities to build through year 2040 – the C Line east extension is not a funded project in the Metro's 2009 LRTP and is instead in the Tier 1 Strategic Unfunded Plan.

References

External links

Metrolink stations in Los Angeles County, California
Norwalk, California
Santa Fe Springs, California
Railway stations in the United States opened in 1995
Proposed California High-Speed Rail stations